John Pringle (c.1716-1792), was a Scottish merchant and politician who sat in the House of Commons between 1765 and 1786.
 

Pringle was the son of John Pringle  MP, of The Haining, and Anne Murray, daughter of Sir James Murray, MP of Philiphaugh. When he was young, Pringle went to Madeira and made a fortune in the wine trade. His father died in 1754, and he purchased the family estate of Haining from his elder brother Andrew. After he came back from Madeira he split his time between his property in Scotland and his business interests in the firm of Scott and Pringle of Threadneedle Street, London

Pringle possessed a family interest in the county and burgh of Selkirk and was returned as Member of Parliament for Selkirkshire in June 1765. He was described as a kindly and generous man, beloved by his kinsmen and constituents, whom he advised and assisted in their financial affairs. They returned him unopposed for over 20 years.   
      
Pringle died on 27 July 1792.

He was father to Mark Pringle of Haining and Clifton.

References

1710s births
1792 deaths
Members of the Parliament of Great Britain for Scottish constituencies
British MPs 1761–1768
British MPs 1768–1774
British MPs 1774–1780
British MPs 1780–1784
British MPs 1784–1790